The Cold Heart of the Sun is the fourth studio album by German metalcore band Maroon. It was released on October 22, 2007 on Century Media. A music video was filmed for the song "(Reach) The Sun".

Track listing 
 "(Reach) The Sun" – 4:47	
 "Only the Sleeper Left the World" – 4:57
 "Steelbath Your Heart" – 3:40	
 "My Funeral Song" – 4:55	
 "Black Halo!" – 4:40	
 "The Cold Heart of the Sun" – 1:23	
 "For Those Unseen" – 3:49	
 "As Truth Becomes Vain" – 4:08	
 "The Iron Council" – 3:55
 "Fear the Most Them Who Protect" – 3:53
 "Some Goodbyes are Farewells" – 5:06

2007 albums
Maroon (band) albums